The Yamaha FZX750 was a motorcycle made by Yamaha from the early 1980s until the mid-1990s. The US version was  the FZX700 Fazer, imported only in 1986 and 1987, with a 50 cc smaller engine displacement to avoid import tariffs on motorcycles larger than 700 cc.

Its engine was a retuned version of the four-stroke DOHC twenty-valve four-cylinder inline engine found in the FZ750, producing ten BHP less than the 105 of the sports model, but having a stronger midrange. It had an almost solid rear wheel, low seat, and more chrome than would normally be expected.  Unusually, it had downdraft carburettors built into the design of the thirteen-litre tank.

Notes

FZX750